Protein atonal homolog 1 is a protein that in humans is encoded by the ATOH1 gene.

Function 

This protein belongs to the basic helix-loop-helix (BHLH) family of transcription factors. It activates E-box dependent transcription along with TCF3 (E47). ATOH1 is required for the formation of both neural and non-neural cell types. Using genetic deletion in mice, Atoh1 has been shown to be essential for formation of cerebellar granule neurons, inner ear hair cells, spinal cord interneurons, Merkel cells of the skin, and intestinal secretory cells (goblet, enteroendocrine, and Paneth cells). ATOH1 is a mammalian homolog of the Drosophila melanogaster gene atonal.  ATOH1 is considered part of the Notch signaling pathway.

In 2009, ATOH1 was identified as a tumor suppressor gene.

References

Further reading

External links 
 
 ATOH1 and cancer suppression
 

Transcription factors
Tumor suppressor genes